was a subprefecture of Okinawa Prefecture, Japan. It was abolished in March 2009. Most of its functions were taken over by the Miyako Office of the prefecture.

It included the following cities and towns of Miyako Islands:

Miyakojima (city on Miyakojima, Ikemajima, Ōgamijima, Kurimajima, Irabujima, and Shimojishima)
Tarama (village on Taramajima and Minnajima), constituting Miyako District

Offices
Miyako Subprefecture: 1125 Hirara Nishizato, Miyakojima-shi, Okinawa-ken. 906-0012

External links
 Official website
 

Subprefectures in Okinawa Prefecture